Juego peligroso ("Dangerous Game") is a 1967 Mexican film. It was directed by Luis Alcoriza.

External links
 

1967 films
Mexican crime comedy films
1960s Spanish-language films
Films directed by Luis Alcoriza
1960s Mexican films